James Proudstar, known first as Thunderbird and then as Warpath, is a fictional superhero appearing in American comic books published by Marvel Comics, most often those about the fictional superhero team X-Men. Proudstar first appears as the second Thunderbird in New Mutants #16 (June 1984).

Blaming the X-Men for the death of his brother Thunderbird, Proudstar joins the Hellions squad, a group of young mutants led by Emma Frost. He later becomes a longtime member of the militant X-Men offshoot X-Force.

Proudstar is an Apache and one of the few Native American superheroes in Marvel Comics. His powers are superhuman strength, speed, and flight.

Warpath appeared in the 2014 film, X-Men: Days of Future Past, portrayed by Booboo Stewart.

Publication history

Proudstar first appears as the second Thunderbird in New Mutants #16 (June 1984), created by writer Chris Claremont and artist Sal Buscema. The character initially appears as an antagonist of the New Mutants and X-Men, but eventually joins the New Mutants in issue #99 of that series. The character appears regularly as a member of that team for most of the duration of the title.

Fictional character biography

Early life
James Proudstar was born on the Apache reservation at Camp Verde, Arizona.

He has one older brother, John. John is a mutant superhero: Thunderbird, a member of the X-Men. John is killed on one of the team's missions, and James blames the X-Men's founder, Professor X, for his brother's death.

Thunderbird
Seeking revenge for his brother's death, James is recruited for Emma Frost's Hellions. As a Hellion, James clashes with the New Mutants and Kitty Pryde, but to his chagrin, Frost feels they are not ready to take on the adult X-Men. James defies Frost's orders, dons his brother's costume, and kidnaps former X-Man Banshee to draw the team to the Cheyenne Mountain Complex, where John was killed. However, when the opportunity to kill Professor X arrives, James finds he has too many doubts about how John joined the X-Men. James is reconciled with the X-Men; Professor X offers him membership in the New Mutants, but he declines out of loyalty to his friends in the Hellions.

Months later, James leaves the Hellions and returns home to his family's reservation. Cable makes him another offer to join the New Mutants but he turns it down. After a meeting in New York City, James returns home to find his entire tribe murdered. Finding a Hellfire mercenary's mask at the scene, James deduces that Emma Frost committed the act to punish him for leaving the team.

Warpath
James joins the New Mutants, hoping to track down the Hellions and gain revenge. The New Mutants cut ties with the X-Men and become the militant adventurers X-Force, and James changes his codename to Warpath. With the team, he fights the likes of Toad's Brotherhood of Evil Mutants, and Weapon P.R.I.M.E. As a member of X-Force, James becomes more calm and controlled and strikes up a close friendship with his teammate Theresa Rourke Cassidy. Despite his strong attraction to her, Theresa only sees James as a friend. In a meeting with Emma Frost, she swears she wasn't involved with the deaths of his tribesmen.

Warpath meets Risque, who helps James with his confidence, and the two begin a love affair. However, Risque is being blackmailed by Sledge, and she drugs Warpath and brings him to his lair. Sledge's partner, the Vanisher, has disappeared in the Darkforce dimension, while teleporting. Sledge reveals to James that his enhanced senses would allow him to survive in this alternate dimension without going insane.  James locates and rescues the Vanisher, who is being held captive by natives of the Darkforce Dimension, and in turn Sledge gives information on one of his tribesman, Michael Whitecloud, whom James had presumed deceased. Whitecloud tells him that Stryfe, X-Force's adversary, was behind the killing of his tribe. James goes to Hell to gain revenge but is returned to the living world by Blackheart. When James finds out Risque's involvement, he ends their relationship.

After X-Force's disintegration, Warpath joins the Mumbai branch of the international mutant agency X-Corporation. His new team is a mix of old and new friends: Feral, Sunfire, and Thornn. He stays there for a while, helping to save Professor X's life.

Cable and Domino enlist Warpath's help against the Skornn. After Cable kills the demon once again, the X-Force disbands.

Warpath is one of the few mutants to retain his powers after the events of Decimation. He begins living in the Mutant camp at the X-Mansion.

Shortly afterwards, he joins the X-Men at Professor X's request. Warpath has a bond of sorts with fellow X-Men Hepzibah; Hepzibah remarks that his presence has helped her mourn her loss of Corsair. Together, they confront one of the X-Mansion's guardian Sentinels when Caliban, a long time X-Men ally, runs onto the grounds. Warpath enters the Morlock tunnels along with Hepzibah, Storm, and Caliban, to investigate the Morlocks' increased activity, which has included the capture of X-Men ward Leech. They see Warpath's name written on a Morlock wall, along with the names of the other X-Men. After the Morlock encounter, Hepzibah and Warpath begin a relationship.

Warpath rejoins X-Force as they search a Cooperstown hospital to pick up the trail of the fugitive Cable. As X-Force dispatches the remaining Reavers, Caliban sacrifices himself to save Warpath by intercepting bullets meant for him. Warpath and the rest of X-Force are charged with taking down Predator X.

Warpath, Hepzibah, and Iceman meet up with Archangel in San Francisco, California. All four are caught in the effects of an illusion, created by Martinique Jason, which has transformed the city into a hippie paradise. Warpath (calling himself "Running Sun") and the others are sent by Jason to confront Cyclops and Emma Frost. After Emma breaks through Jason's illusion, Warpath and the others return to normal. They begin to reestablish the X-Men organization in San Francisco.

Warpath is one of the founding members of the new X-Force, Cyclops's covert wetwork team, charged with finding and eliminating Purifiers cells. James joins out of a desire for revenge for the death of Caliban at the hands of the Purifiers. During X-Force's encounter with the Purifiers, James comes across Eli Bard attacking X-23; after rescuing her, Eli swears a personal vendetta against him. Since the team is not allowed to contact anyone from the outside world, he cannot be with his girlfriend, Hepzibah.

James takes a break from duty, in order to make peace with the deaths he has caused and to visit his brother's grave. En route, his truck is destroyed by the Demon Bear. He is badly beaten before being rescued by Ghost Rider. After defeating the Demon Bear with the aid of Ghost Rider, he learns that this creature was created when the animal spirits of his people were disturbed. They tell James that Eli Bard has dug up Thunderbird, Caliban, and everyone else buried there.

When Surge, Hellion, and Boom-Boom are kidnapped, Warpath and the X-Force attempt to save them but are teleported off to the future to find Cable and Hope Summers. Arriving in the future, X-Force is ambushed by a future version of Deadpool, who leads them to Cable. Eventually they come across Stryfe's Celestial city, learning he is in control of that era. After his forces are defeated, Stryfe kidnaps Hope and Warpath, taking them back to his fortress where he tortures James. After the final battle against Stryfe, James flies Domino and X-23 back where they first appeared in the future.

Warpath is caught up in the Necrosha events when his Blackbird crashes after a lightning strike. Making it to shore, the group encounters a resurrected Pyro and Berzerker. After taking them out, James is confronted by his ex-girlfriend, Risque, where she pleads with him to get away before she is controlled again by the T-O Virus. He is rescued by Archangel, who informs him this is Eli Bard's doing. They meet up with Cyclops and are confronted by Selene's Inner Circle. During the battle, Eli takes on Warpath, who wants the knife responsible for creating the Demon Bear. James is kidnapped by Selene's Inner Circle and taken to Genosha. There he fights and kills his deceased brother John. With the help of ancient rituals from his tribe and Selene's knife, James stabs Selene in the heart and frees his brother's soul at last. After the battle, James quits X-Force with Wolverine, claiming that he "has made his peace".

James sides with Cyclops in the Schism.

After working with War Machine to stop a war in Eastern Europe, Warpath's teammate Jubilee is captured by vampires. Warpath and the rest of this X-Squad have been attacking vampire hordes trying to find their friend.

Warpath appears as a target for the newly revamped Weapon X Program and is opted to join Old Man Logan's new team.

Powers and abilities

Physical characteristics

Physical capabilities
Warpath is a mutant who possesses superhuman physical ability in virtually all areas.

He possesses superhuman strength. The air pressure from one of his claps causes a Sentinel to collapse. He has even managed to hold his own in a direct fight against the Juggernaut.

He possesses superhuman resistance to injury, at least enough to withstand short-range gunfire, grenade explosions, and direct telekinetic attack from Exodus. He also repairs, and regenerates damaged and destroyed tissue much faster than a normal human, as well as revives and recuperates from exhaustion and fatigue much faster than a normal human.

He possesses superhuman agility and flexibility. He can "move with the grace an Olympic gold-medalist would envy" and "swim with the ease of a porpoise."

His power of flight was discovered by his one-time mentor and team leader Peter Wisdom, who analyzed his mutation after the High Evolutionary devolved and re-evolved all mutants on Earth, and Wisdom forced James to incorporate this ability in his fighting style. This power was ignored for a while, as writer Ed Brubaker did not understand how Warpath's speed and strength would allow it. However, Warpath's fighting style in the Messiah Complex storyline showed his flight powers, and X-Force shows him flying for long distances. It has since been suggested by writer Christopher Yost that Warpath felt "rather embarrassed by the whole flying thing."

Warpath's senses – particularly sight, smell, and hearing – are enhanced to levels beyond the capabilities of a normal human. He is able to see with perfect clarity at much greater distances than an ordinary human, even in near-total darkness. His hearing is similarly heightened, enabling him to clearly hear sounds beyond the range of ordinary human hearing and to hear sounds that they can detect but at much greater distances.

After nearly getting killed by Reignfire, Warpath experienced an increase in senses and speed that allowed him to perform feats he had previously not been aware he was capable of. For example, he can run at high speeds up to at least  for long distances and quickly climb building walls by digging his hands and feet into the bare concrete. He can even evade weapon fire with rapid reflexes and reactions.

In new publishing coinciding along Marvel's new ResurrXion event, Warpath has showcased regenerative abilities able to recover from mild to serious injuries inflicted upon him by new Weapon X cyborgs.

Training
Warpath is well versed in hand-to-hand combat, which is enhanced by his superhuman reflex/reaction rate and eye/ear-hand/foot coordination. He was trained in unarmed combat under the guidance of Emma Frost. He gained extensive training in the use of the staff by his long-time teammate Shatterstar, whom he eventually matched in a record time of only a dozen tries. He wields a pair of bowie knives composed of vibranium, given to him by Storm, with which he has proved to be highly proficient.

James is also a skilled hunter and tracker in his native Apache tradition.

Supernatural capabilities
Ghost Rider activated limited Apache shaman abilities within James, in order to help him fight the Demon Bear. He could perceive the creature's wounds and the resulting spirit energy when it was destroyed.

Reception
 In 2014, Entertainment Weekly ranked Thunderbird and Warpath 62nd in their "Let's rank every X-Man ever" list.
 In 2018, CBR.com ranked Warpath 9th in their "X-Force: 20 Powerful Members" list.

Other versions

Ultimate Marvel
In the Ultimate Comics: X-Men storyline, James Proudstar is a member of the mutant liberation in the Southwest.

What If
James Proudstar appears in the What If story "What If the X-Men Died on their First Mission?" Following the death of his brother and the X-Men on Krakoa, he joins Beast's hastily assembled mutant team – consisting of himself, Theresa Cassidy (who named herself Banshee in honor of her late father), Rahne Sinclair, Namorita, Scarlet Witch, and her brother Quicksilver – to combat Count Nefaria and his Ani-Men. James joined only to kill Professor X, whom he held responsible for his brother's death. However, he avoids John's fate in the mainstream comics and, finally acknowledging that his brother laid down his life in order to save others, joins the new X-Men team afterwards.

In other media
Warpath appears in X-Men: Days of Future Past, portrayed by Booboo Stewart. In this interpretation, he wields his signature bowie knives and displays acute senses, enhanced strength and superhuman stamina, agility and reflexes, picking up the Sentinels first out of the remaining X-Men. At the beginning of the film, Warpath attempts to stall the Sentinels so Kitty and Bishop could change the past. Taking his final stand, he rushes at an awaiting Sentinel but is obliterated when it uses its energy blast. While stalling the Sentinels so Wolverine could change the timeline, he is executed by a Sentinel burning his face off. These events are later erased by the altering of the timeline.

Warpath appears as a playable character in Marvel: Future Fight.

References

External links
 Warpath at Marvel.com
 UncannyXmen.net Spotlight on Warpath

Characters created by Chris Claremont
Characters created by Sal Buscema
Comics characters introduced in 1984
Fictional Apache people
Fictional characters with superhuman senses
Fictional knife-fighters
Fictional soldiers
Marvel Comics characters who can move at superhuman speeds
Marvel Comics characters with accelerated healing
Marvel Comics characters with superhuman strength
Marvel Comics film characters
Marvel Comics male superheroes
Marvel Comics male supervillains
Marvel Comics martial artists
Marvel Comics mutants
Marvel Comics orphans
New Mutants